Empirical may refer to:

 Epistemic topics

 Empiricism, a theory of knowledge as coming only or primarily from experience
 Empirical evidence, a source of knowledge acquired by means of observation or experimentation
 Empirical research, a way of gaining knowledge by means of direct and indirect observation or experience
 Empirical relationship, a relationship based solely on observation rather than theory
 Quasi-empirical method, as close to empiricism as is possible when experience cannot falsify
 Empirical limits in science, problems with observation, and thus are limits of human ability to inquire and answer questions

 Music

 Empirical, the alternative title for the 1972 Jaki Byard album There'll Be Some Changes Made
 Empirical (jazz band), a British jazz group, formed in 2007, with four musicians

 Other topics (many are applications of epistemic themes)

 Empirical distribution function, the cumulative distribution function associated with the empirical measure of the sample
 Empirical formula, the simplest positive integer ratio of atoms present in a chemical compound
 Empirical likelihood, an estimation method in statistics
 Empirical measure, a random measure arising from a particular realization of a (usually finite) sequence of random variables
 Empirical modelling, computer modelling based on empirical observations rather than on mathematically describable relationships of the system modelled
 Empirical probability, the ratio of the number of outcomes in which a specified event occurs to the total number of trials
 Empirical process, a stochastic process that describes the proportion of objects in a system in a given state
 Empiric therapy, therapy based on clinical educated guesses
 Empirical, a research vessel that was used by Darth Vader in Star Wars